Edward Armstrong may refer to:

 Edward Armstrong (cricketer) (1881–1963), Australian cricketer
 Edward Allworthy Armstrong (1900–1978), ornithologist and Church of England clergyman 
 Edward Armstrong (historian) (1846–1928), English historian
 Edward H. Armstrong (1880–1938), mayor of Daytona Beach, Florida 
 Edward Robert Armstrong (1876–1955), Canadian engineer and inventor
 Henry Edward Armstrong (1848–1937), English chemist
 Edward Frankland Armstrong (1878–1945), English industrial chemist
 Dr Edward George Armstrong, character in Agatha Christie's mystery novel, And Then There Were None